Django Strikes Again (lit. "Django 2 - The Great Return") is a 1987 Italian Spaghetti Western film directed by Nello Rossati, under the pseudonym Ted Archer. It is the only official sequel to Django.

Synopsis
Twenty years after the events in the first Django, the title character has left the violent life of a gunslinger to become a monk. Living in seclusion in a monastery, he wants no more of the violent actions he perpetrated. Suddenly, he learns from a dying former lover that some time ago he had a young daughter, who has been kidnapped along with other children who are now working for a ruthless Belgian criminal known as El Diablo (The Devil) Orlowsky, who is an arms dealer and slave trader. The children and other prisoners work in Orlowsky's mine, from which he hopes to get rich from the spoils. Determined to find his daughter and nail the bad guys, Django gets some arms and goes on the warpath against Orlowsky's private army.

Cast 

 Franco Nero as Django/Brother Ignatius
 Christopher Connelly as 'El Diablo' Orlowsky
 Donald Pleasence as Ben Gunn
 Licinia Lentini (as Licia Lee Lyon) as Countess Isabelle
 Roberto Posse (as Robert Posse) as German Diablo Henchman
 Alessandro Di Chio as Captain
 Rodrigo Obregón as Diablo Henchman
 Miguel Carreno (as Micky) as Local Boy
 William Berger as Old Gunfighter
 Bill Moore as Old Gunfighter
 Consuelo Reina as Dona Gabriela

Production 
Django Strikes Again was conceived concurrently with Duccio Tessari's Tex and the Lord of the Deep; both projects were intended to represent a revival of the Spaghetti Western genre. Following the commercial failure of Tex, Sergio Corbucci, who had co-written Django Strikes Again and had initially agreed to direct it, refused to partake in its production. Shot on location in Colombia, the film represents the final screen appearance of Christopher Connelly, who died of cancer a year after its release. Nero stated in a 2012 interview that he is "not happy with the film" and called it "a bit flat".

Release
Django Strikes Again was released theatrically in Germany on November 6, 1987 as Djangos Rückkehr.

Sequel 
Following a 2014 attempt to mount the project, it was reported in May 2016 that Franco Nero would reprise his role in a third and final outing as the titular character, entitled Django Lives! The film was to be set 50 years after the events of the original installment. John Sayles was to direct.

References

External links
 

1987 films
1980s Italian-language films
English-language Italian films
1980s English-language films
Spaghetti Western films
Films shot in Colombia
Italian sequel films
Django films
1987 Western (genre) films
Films directed by Nello Rossati
1987 multilingual films
Italian multilingual films
1980s Italian films